"Unnatural Blonde" is a song by German recording artist Sandy Mölling. It was written by Maryann Morgan, Niclas Molinder, Joacim Persson, and Pelle Ankarberg for her debut solo album Unexpected (2004), with production helmed by Moldinder and Persson under their production moniker Twin. Selected as Mölling's solo debut single following the hiatus of her former band No Angels, the uptempo pop song was released on 21 May 2004 in German-speaking Europe and became a top ten hit in Germany.

Formats and track listings

Credits and personnel

 Pelle Ankarberg – backing vocals
 Niklas Flyckt – mixing
 Fredrik Landh – drums
 Joje Lindskog – drums
 Sandy Mölling – vocals

 Maryann Morgan – backing vocals
 Mats Norrefalk – guitar
 Joacim Persson – bass, guitar
 Twin – production, programming

Charts

References

2004 songs
Polydor Records singles
Songs written by Niclas Molinder
Songs written by Joacim Persson